Anatol Chirinciuc (born 4 February 1989) is a Moldovan footballer who plays for Zimbru Chișinău as a goalkeeper.

Honours
Zimbru Chișinău
Moldovan Cup: 2013–14
Moldovan Super Cup: 2014

References

External links

1989 births
Living people
Moldovan footballers
Moldovan expatriate footballers
Moldovan expatriate sportspeople in Romania
Association football goalkeepers
FC Zimbru Chișinău players
FCM Dunărea Galați players
FC Sfîntul Gheorghe players
FC Saxan players
FC Speranța Crihana Veche players
FC Milsami Orhei players
Expatriate footballers in Cyprus
Expatriate footballers in Romania